is a Japanese manga series by . It was serialized in the  manga magazine Daria from 2000 to 2003. A live-action film adaptation was released on October 27, 2007. A live-action film sequel titled Ai no Kotodama: Sekai no Hate Made, based on the short story Sekai no Hate Made compiled with Ai no Kotodama'''s volumes, was released on August 7, 2010.

Plot
Shinya Otani and Miyako Tachibana have been inseparable since high school. Now college students, both live together in a small rented apartment in the city while keeping their relationship as a secret, in order to avoid unnecessary complications. However, their happy life begins to fall apart after they meet Yukiko Mizusawa, an old friend from high school. While Tachibana welcomes her with open arms, Otani is not as excited as he is, mainly because at school there used to be rumors that Tachibana and Mizusawa were dating. As time goes by, Otani can not help feeling more and more jealous of Mizusawa, especially after realizing how perfect she was and believing that she was in love with Tachibana. His jealousy only gets stronger when she gives Tachibana a perfume for his birthday called "Jealousy", which turns out to be the same one that she uses. Otani becomes hostile and unfriendly, even beginning to doubt about the feelings of his lover for him and treating him coldly. This situation continues until, due to a series of misunderstandings after another, both argue and decide to separate for a while.

Otani refuges in the apartment of Shougo Sunochi, a college friend who deals with a long-distance relationship with a young American boy named Alfred. Tachibana, meanwhile, tries to fix the things between them and sends Otani a text message citing him to talk, but he does not see it as his cell phone stops working after getting wet. Believing that Otani had ignored him, Tachibana begins to fall into depression. Mizusawa, aware that something bad was happening between the two, finds the courage to confess to Otani that it was really him and not Tachibana who had always been in love with, only to come to the shocking realization that Otani and Tachibana were in fact, a couple.

After clarifying things, Otani and Tachibana make up again. Otani, feeling sorry for his behavior, invites Mizusawa to throw fireworks with them at their university, where Mizusawa concludes that her feelings for Otani would never be reciprocated, but that was okay because she had always enjoyed seeing them together. The film ends with Otani and Tachibana being a happy couple again and enjoying their company, with Otani hoping that one day his words of devotion, having so much power, will reach Tachibana.

Characters
Yasuka Saitō as Miyako Tachibana
Hidenori Tokuyama as Shinya Otani
Rinako Matsuoka as Yukiko "Yuki" Mizusawa
Masashi Kagami as Shougo Sunochi
Junko Ōkura as Kana Morikawa
Yui Iwata as Yūko Kitagaki
Kentarō Sakai as Ramen Shop's Owner
Kimiaki Tasaka
Shiomi Andō

Media

It was serialized in the  manga magazine Daria. The chapters were later released in two bound volumes by Frontier Works under the Daria Comics imprint.

Film

A live-action film adaptation of Ai no Kotodama was produced by Video Planning and released in theaters nationwide across Japan on October 27, 2007. The film stars Yasuka Saitō as Miyako Tachibana and Hidenori Tokuyama as Shinya Ōtani. Prior to the film's release, a DVD containing behind-the-scenes footage was released on October 24, 2007. The film was later released on DVD on January 25, 2008. The film's theme song is "Eve" by Hidenori Tokuyama. Tokuyama also performed the song "Life" as an insert song for the film.

A sequel titled Ai no Kotodama: Sekai no Hate Made was released in select theaters nationwide on August 7, 2010. The film stars  as Hirofumi Sasaki and Ryunosuke Kawai as Shinji Tamura. Yasuka Saitō reprised his role as Miyako Tachibana from the previous film. Several elements of the story were changed for the film adaptation, such as making the characters into working-class adults when they were high school students in the original manga. Kawai composed and performed the theme song to the film. Prior to the film's release, a DVD containing behind-the-scenes footage was released on June 23, 2010. The film was later released on DVD on October 22, 2010.

References

External links

 

2000s Japanese films
2000s Japanese-language films
2007 films
2007 LGBT-related films
Boys' love films
Films set in Japan
Gay-related films
Japanese LGBT-related films
Live-action films based on manga
Yaoi anime and manga